Massacre at Marble City (released in U.K. as Conquerors of Arkansas) is a 1964 German-French-Italian  western film directed by Paul Martin  and starring Mario Adorf and Brad Harris. It is loosely based on Friedrich Gerstäcker's 1845 novel Die Regulatoren von Arkansas. It was shot on location in Czechoslovakia.

Plot

Cast 
 Brad Harris as Phil Stone
 Mario Adorf as Matt Ellis
 Horst Frank as Dan McCormick
 Dorothee Parker as Jane Brendel
 Olga Schoberová as Mary Brendel
 Ralf Wolter as Tim Fletcher
 Marianne Hoppe as Mrs. Brendel
 Dieter Borsche as Pastor Benson
 Thomas Alder as Erik Brendel
 Joseph Egger as Fishbury
 Philippe Lemaire as  Jim Donovan
 Fulvia Franco as Ilona
 Serge Marquand as Fielding

References

External links

1964 films
West German films
1960s German-language films
Films directed by Paul Martin
French Western (genre) films
German Western (genre) films
Italian Western (genre) films
1964 Western (genre) films
Films set in Arkansas
Films based on German novels
Films scored by Francesco De Masi
Constantin Film films
1960s historical films
German historical films
Italian historical films
French historical films
1960s French films
1960s German films
1960s Italian films